Scandinavia generally refers to the region consisting of Denmark, Norway, and Sweden.

Scandinavia may also refer to:

Places
 Scandinavian Peninsula, a peninsula in Northern Europe
 Scandinavia Township, Harlan County, Nebraska, U.S.
 Scandinavia, Wisconsin, U.S., a village
 Scandinavia (town), Wisconsin, adjacent to the village
 Scandinavia, Manitoba, Canada

Music 
 Scandinavia (album), by Michael Learns to Rock, 2012
 "Scandinavia" (composition), by Van Morrison, 1982
 "Scandinavia", a song by Morrissey from World Peace Is None of Your Business, 2014

Ships 
 MS Scandinavia, several ships
 USS Scandinavia (SP-3363), a US Navy patrol vessel 1918–1919, later the US Coast and Geodetic Survey ship USC&GS Scandinavia

See also	
 Nordic countries, the broader region that includes Scandinavia
 Pan-Scandinavia
 Scandinavian (disambiguation)
 Scandinavica (disambiguation)